Scott James DeFreitas ( born in Newton, Massachusetts) is an American actor, best known for his role as Andrew "Andy" Dixon (#5) on the American television soap opera, As the World Turns (1985 to 1995; 1997 to 2000).

DeFreitas has been married to his former ATWT co-star Maura West (Carly Tenney) since January 22, 2000. The couple has four children, sons Joseph (born 2000) Basil (born 2007) and daughters Katherine (born 2002) Birdie (born 2009). From his marriage to Maura, he also has a stepson Benjamin (born 1996).

He and his two eldest children Joseph and Katherine performed in a reading for new musical "Hazel" along with Judy Nazemetz, Zoe Calamar, Noah Meyers, and Jane Noseworthy. This was performed alongside other musical "Inside Out".

Sources

External links

Scott DeFreitas' SoapCentral actor page

American male soap opera actors
1969 births
Living people